Oormakale Vida Tharu is a 1980 Indian Malayalam-language film,  directed by Ravi Gupthan. The film stars Srividya and Prathap Pothen. The film has musical score by KJ Joy.

Cast
Srividya
Prathap Pothen

Soundtrack
The music was composed by KJ Joy with lyrics by Dr. Pavithran.

References

External links
 

1980 films
1980s Malayalam-language films